The Blue One is a 1994 German drama film written and directed by Lienhard Wawrzyn. It was entered into the 44th Berlin International Film Festival.

Cast

References

External links

1994 films
1994 drama films
German drama films
1990s German-language films
1990s German films